Dorothy L. Hukill (September 20, 1946 – October 2, 2018) was an American politician who was a Republican member in the Florida Senate who represented parts of the Volusia County area from 2012 until her death in 2018. She represented the 14th district, encompassing southern Volusia and northern Brevard Counties, since 2016, after being redistricted from the 8th district, which included parts of Volusia, Lake, and Marion Counties. She also served in the Florida House of Representatives, representing the 28th district in southern Volusia from 2004 to 2012.

Biography
Hukill was born in New York City, New York, and attended Hunter College, which is part of the City University of New York system, where she graduated with her bachelor's degree in 1967. She later attended Columbia University, graduating with her master's degree in 1970, and graduated from the St. John's University School of Law in 1978 and began practicing law. In 1988, Hukill moved to Florida, initially settling in Ponce Inlet, where she served as a Councilwoman from 1992 to 1994. She later moved to Port Orange, serving as its Vice Mayor from 1998 to 2000 and its Mayor from 2000 to 2004.

Florida Legislature

Florida House of Representatives
In 2004, when incumbent Democratic State Representative Suzanne Kosmas was unable to seek an additional term in the House due to term limits, Hukill ran to succeed her in the 28th District, which stretched from Oak Hill to Ponce Inlet in southern Volusia County. She won the Republican primary uncontested, and advanced to the general election, where she faced Jim Ward, the Democratic nominee and, like Hukill, a former Mayor of Port Orange, and independent candidate Richard Paul Dembinsky. The Orlando Sentinel praised both candidates as "intelligent and experienced," but ultimately endorsed Hukill over Ward, praising her "blunt and assertive 'get-it-done' style." Ultimately, she narrowly defeated Ward, winning 51% of the vote to his 47% and Dembinsky's 2%. Running for re-election in 2006, Hukill was challenged by William Smalley, the Democratic nominee. She campaigned on her record in the legislature of creating a solar energy program that "awards grants for residential and business solar-energy systems," and pledged to expand the program to attract manufacturers to the state in her second term. Hukill managed to increase her margin of victory, scoring 57% of the vote to Smalley's 43%. She faced Smalley once again in 2008, and defeated him handily once again, receiving 62% of the vote to his 38%. Running for her final term in 2010, Hukill was challenged in the Republican primary by Teresa Valdes, who argued that businesses in the state were "overtaxed." The Sentinel endorsed Hukill, whom they praised for her "solid leadership record," over Valdes, whom they criticized for lacking "thoughtfulness." Hukill easily defeated her opponent to win renomination, and won the general election in a landslide against only write-in opposition.

Florida Senate
In 2012, when Hukill was unable to seek a fifth term in the Florida House of Representatives due to term limits and the state's legislative districts were redrawn, she opted to run for the Florida Senate in the newly created 8th District. She won the Republican primary uncontested, and advanced to the general election, where she faced Frank Bruno, the Chairman of the Volusia County Council and the Democratic nominee. A contentious election ensued, with both Hukill and Bruno raising hundreds of thousands of dollars for their campaigns, and both the Florida Democratic Party and the Republican Party of Florida spending millions of dollars to promote their candidacies, though as the election grew closer, Bruno's supporters declined to expand their advertising on his behalf. The Orlando Sentinel strongly endorsed Bruno over Hukill, criticizing her for serving as "a loyal soldier for House GOP leaders" during her time in the legislature and for sponsoring "some truly bad bills," and for her refusal to condemn what they referred to as a "ridiculous" advertisement featuring actors with "exaggerated Italian-American accents" that portrayed Bruno as Volusia County's "political boss." Ultimately, however, despite the perceived closeness of the race, Hukill overwhelmingly defeated Bruno, receiving 57% of the vote to Bruno's 43%.

While serving in the Senate, Hukill sponsored legislation that would allow manufacturers to "not have to pay a sales tax on equipment purchased in a three-year period beginning in April 2014," declaring, "The single biggest expense manufacturers have is equipment costs." Hukill took a strong stance against legislation that would "collect sales tax when Florida residents make online purchases," voting against it in committee.

Hukill's senate district was reconfigured and renumbered after court-ordered redistricting in 2016.

Health and death
On September 28, 2018, Hukill announced that she would not seek reelection and was entering hospice care due to complications of cervical cancer. She died from the illness on October 2, 2018.

References

External links
Hukill for Senate 
Florida State Senate - Dorothy Hukill

|-

|-

1946 births
2018 deaths
Columbia University alumni
Women state legislators in Florida
Florida city council members
Women city councillors in Florida
Women mayors of places in Florida
Republican Party Florida state senators
Republican Party members of the Florida House of Representatives
Hunter College alumni
St. John's University School of Law alumni
Florida lawyers
Lawyers from New York City
Politicians from New York City
People from Port Orange, Florida
21st-century American politicians
21st-century American women politicians
Deaths from cancer in Florida
Deaths from cervical cancer
20th-century American lawyers
20th-century American women